Ani is a surname. Notable people with the surname include:

Jananne Al-Ani (born 1966), artist, born to an Iraqi father and Irish mother
Jeremiah Ani (born 1985), Nigerian international footballer
Kwadwo Ani, one of Ghana's premier contemporary artists
Maret Ani (born 1982), Estonian tennis player
Marimba Ani, anthropologist and African Studies scholar
Michael Ani (born 1917), chairman of FEDECO in Nigeria

See also

Ant (name)